The 2015 California Golden Bears football team represented the University of California, Berkeley in the 2015 NCAA Division I FBS football season. The Bears were led by third-year head coach Sonny Dykes and played their home games at Memorial Stadium. 

At the beginning of the season, Cal jumped out to a 5–0 start, their best since 2007.  In Week 3, the Bears defeated Texas 45–44 in Austin, marking the program's first-ever victory over the Longhorns.  The following week, Cal beat Washington 30–24, earning their first victory in Seattle since 2005 and snapping a six-game losing streak to the Huskies. Cal then went on to lose five of its next six games, including losses to rivals UCLA, USC, and Oregon, and a 13-point loss to arch-rival Stanford for their sixth consecutive Big Game defeat. The Golden Bears rebounded with a 54–24 win over last-place Oregon State, in which Cal gained a school-record 760 yards while becoming bowl-eligible for the first time since 2011.  With a 48–46 win over Arizona State on Senior Day, Cal finished the regular season with a 7–5 record, clinching their first winning season since 2011.  They finished the year 8–5 including a 55–36 victory over Air Force in the Armed Forces Bowl. Nevertheless, at 4–5 Cal finished with a losing Pac-12 the record for the third consecutive season. 

The 2015 season was the last at Cal for three-year starting quarterback Jared Goff, who entered the program at the same time as Dykes and set 26 team records during his time in Berkeley. Following the Armed Forces Bowl, Goff declared for the 2016 NFL Draft. He was selected first overall by the Los Angeles Rams, and went on to lead the Rams to Super Bowl LIII.

Following the season, Sonny Dykes' contract was extended until 2019, owing to the team's athletic and academic improvements during his tenure.

Schedule

Personnel

Coaching staff

Roster

Recruiting

Incoming class 2015
SCOUT RIVALS, ESPN, as well as the official roster are the primary sources. The incoming class was ranked #25 by Rivals, #36 by Scout, and #53 by ESPN.

Commitments for 2016
SCOUT RIVALS and ESPN are the primary sources. As of 10/9/2015 the 2016 class is ranked #25 by Rivals# and #38 by Scout.

Rankings

Game summaries

Grambling State

San Diego State

Texas

Washington

Washington State

Utah

UCLA

USC

Oregon

Oregon State

Stanford

Arizona State

Air Force

References

California
California Golden Bears football seasons
Armed Forces Bowl champion seasons
California Golden Bears football